The Slovak Radio Symphony Orchestra, previously known as Czecho-Slovak Radio Symphony Orchestra and CSR Symphony Orchestra, is a symphony radio orchestra based in Bratislava, Slovakia.

Founded in 1929 to serve Slovak Radio, the orchestra became particularly associated with the music of Slovak composers, notably Alexander Moyzes, Eugen Suchoň and Ján Cikker.

Chief conductors of the orchestra have included Krešimir Baranović, Ľudovít Rajter, Ladislav Slovák, Václav Jiráček, Otakar Trhlík, Bystrík Režucha, Ondrej Lenárd (1977–90), Róbert Stankovský (1990–2001), Charles Olivieri-Munroe (2001–03), Oliver von Dohnányi (2006–07), and Mario Kosik. in 2019, Ondrej Lenárd was installed as the chief conductor.

The orchestra has become well known abroad through its broadcasts and recordings, particularly for the Naxos Records label.

References

Culture in Bratislava
Musical groups established in 1929
Slovak orchestras